Lords of the Street, also known as Jump Out Boys, is a 2008 action film starring DMX and Kris Kristofferson, written and produced by David and Daniel Garcia, better known as Kane & Abel and directed by Amir Valinia. The film takes place in New Orleans, Louisiana after Hurricane Katrina. Sheldon Robins and Veronica Berry also star in the film.

Plot summary
A Mexican drug lord escaped from prison to retrieve $15 million, but two cops (Sheldon Robins and Kristofferson) are sent after him.

Cast
DMX as Vogler
Kris Kristofferson as Raymond
Alec Rayme as Jimmy
Sheldon Robins as Detective McCoy
Veronica Berry as Myesha
Ciera Payton as Maria
 Ameer Baraka as Travis Roundtree
Kane as Thug Twin #1
Abel as Thug Twin #2

External links 
 
 

2008 films
American crime drama films
2000s crime action films
American crime action films
2000s English-language films
2000s American films